"Mayores" is a song by American singer Becky G  and Puerto Rican rapper Bad Bunny. Written by Mario Caceres, Servando Primera, Saul Castillo, Bad Bunny, and Patrick Ingunza, it was released by Kemosabe, RCA and Sony Music Latin as the lead single from her debut studio album Mala Santa on July 14, 2017.

"Mayores" topped the charts in Spain, Ecuador, Chile, Romania, Paraguay, Peru, Bolivia, Honduras, Mexico, Nicaragua, Panama and El Salvador, while peaking at number 3 on the Billboard Hot Latin Songs chart. The music video for the song was released on YouTube on July 13, 2017.

Background
Gomez explained that the song originated as a "joke" after having confirmed her relationship with soccer player Sebastian Lletget, who is four years older than her. She started using the hashtag "#6DaysTillMAYORES" on Twitter which eventually started trending. A number became lower with each passing day, until it reached "#MAYORESOutNow".

Chart performance
"Mayores" debuted at number 12 on the Hot Latin Songs chart, making it Gomez's highest debut peak position on that chart. The song eventually peaked at number 3 on the charts.

The song also debuted at number 72 on the Spanish PROMUSICAE chart. It rose to number 4 four weeks later, making it her highest-peaking position, surpassing the number 37 peak of "Shower". It later reached number one.

Eventually the song charted on the Billboard Hot 100, peaking at number 74, marking Gomez's fourth entrance in the chart in more than two years, after "Shower" (2014) was a top twenty hit, her collaboration with Cher Lloyd, "Oath" (2012), peaked at number 73 and "Can't Stop Dancin" (2014) peaked at number 88 in early 2015.

Music video
The music video, filmed in Los Angeles, was uploaded on Gomez's Vevo account on July 13, 2017. It marks the third time Gomez worked with director Daniel Duran; it also features the appearance American actor Casper Smart. The video reached 1 billion views in January 2018 and has over 1.8 billion views as of May 2020; it is Gomez's most watched video, and her fourth to surpass 100 million views. The music video is one of the 50 most-viewed on Vevo, and is one of the 70 most-viewed YouTube videos. It reached 2 billion views in 2021.

Premise
The clip sees Gomez lying on a couch spliced with scenes of her and Bad Bunny at a bar. Casper Smart, playing an old rich man, enters the place and is attracted to Gomez. He takes her to his house as Bad Bunny raps his verses at the bar. These scenes are also cut with the singers performing on the roof of the Hotel Rosslyn Annex at night. Gomez seduces Smart and handcuffs him to the bed. She plays with his watch before getting off the bed and leaving with a bag full of money. Bad Bunny appears to be waiting for her, and they kiss before getting in the car. The video ends as the duo is about to drive off.

Live performances 
Due to the song becoming a huge success, Gomez was invited to perform it at several radio stations and during interviews. She sang the song regular and acoustic at iHeart Radio Mi Música. She also sang it in Spain in La Vida Moderna and Sale el Sol in acoustic, and regular on Operación Triunfo. Her performance on the latter garnered some attention due to a change in the lyrics at the request of the producers due to them thinking they were "too sexual". Although Gomez agreed, she later stated it bothered her and said she accepted "out of respect" and because it was "a great opportunity", but believes that it wouldn't be done to a man, listing Ozuna and Enrique Iglesias as examples.

Gomez performed the song with Bad Bunny at the Latin American Music Awards of 2017, which she also hosted; the performance was later uploaded to YouTube and has garnered over 60 million views. The song was included on her setlist as an opening act for Fifth Harmony's 2017 PSA Tour and on her own tour in 2018. She sang the song last in her performance at Viña del Mar on March 2, 2019. Gomez included "Mayores" in three medleys: the first at the 2019 Latin American Music Awards together with "Sin Pijama" and "Mala Santa", before receiving the Extraordinary Evolution Award from Pitbull. The second time was at the 2019 MTV Europe Music Awards, this time with "24/7", a track from her debut album replacing "Mala Santa". The third time was at the LOS40 Music Awards 2019 with "Mala Santa" being brought back. All three performances had different arrangements. In the latter performance Gomez rewrote Bad Bunny's verse with lyrics from her "side of the relationship", including a reference to her feature in "Dura (Remix)" with Daddy Yankee, Natti Natasha, and the rapper.

Track listings

Personnel
Jorge Fonseca – production
Yasmil Marrufo – engineering, guiro
Richard Bravo – engineering, percussion
Mambo Kingz – engineering
Gaby Music – engineering
Mike Fuller – master engineering
Credits adapted from Qobuz.

Charts

Weekly charts

Year-end charts

Certifications

See also 
 List of Billboard Hot Latin Songs and Latin Airplay number ones of 2018

References

2017 singles
2017 songs
Becky G songs
Bad Bunny songs
Kemosabe Records singles
Songs written by Bad Bunny